Mahbubur Rahman (born 6 January 1957) is a former Bangladeshi cricket umpire. He stood in one Test match, Bangladesh vs. Pakistan, in 2002 and 17 ODI games between 2002 and 2006.

See also
 List of Test cricket umpires
 List of One Day International cricket umpires

References

1957 births
Living people
People from Khulna District
Bangladeshi Test cricket umpires
Bangladeshi One Day International cricket umpires